The RS600FF is a modification of the RS600, light-weight sailing dinghy designed by Clive Everest and Nick Peters. It differs from the conventional RS600 as it has hydrofoils.

Performance and design
It is a single hander with trapeze and racks, and a hydrofoil system similar to the International Moth. The Moth's ultra light weight have made them unsuitable for heavier sailors, the RS600FF was to an extent inspired by the Moth, but being bigger and suited to heavier crews was "made over" despite it being a one design class.

New build
Differences between a brand new RS600FF and a brand new RS600 are:
 Hydrofoil centerboard, with modified centerboard case
 Hydrofoil Rudder, with modified rudder gantry
 Wand system to trim the daggerboard foil fitted to the bow
 Carbon/Epoxy hull as opposed to the Glass Fibre/Epoxy hull
 Lighter weight
 Hi aspect sail
 Higher trolley to incorporate the hydrofoils retracted

Conversions
Conversion are old (or new) conventional RS600's with modifications. The main difference is the hydrofoils:
 Hydrofoil Centerboard, with modified centerboard case
 Hydrofoil Rudder, with modified rudder gantry
 Wand system to trim the daggerboard foil fitted to the bow
Changing the hull material is not possible, however even if the following are missing the boat would still be considered an FF
 Hi aspect sail
 Higher trolley to incorporate the hydrofoils retracted

The RS600 conversion's are reversible, they can be taken off to convert the boat back.

References

External links
 RS Sailing (Global HQ
 ISAF Connect to Sailing
 International RS Classes Association
 UK RS Association
 German RS Class Association

Dinghies
2000s sailboat type designs
Boats designed by Clive Everest
Boats designed by Nick Peters
Sailboat types built by RS Sailing